The title Sir Guy is most commonly ascribed to Sir Guy of Gisbourne, a fictional character in Robin Hood folklore.

Sir Guy may also refer to:

People 

Sir Guy Acland, 6th Baronet, British Army officer and member of the Royal Household
Sir Guy Francis Boileau, 8th of the Boileau baronets
Sir Guy Bracewell-Smith, 3rd Baronet, of the Smith baronets
Sir Guy Brian of Torbryan, Devon, father of Guy de Brian, 4th Baron Brian
Sir Guy Campbell, 1st Baronet, Major-General in the British Army
Sir Guy Campbell, 5th Baronet, a British colonel
Sir Guy Carleton, 1st Baron Dorchester
Sir Guy Calthrop, 1st Baronet
Sir Guy Dawber, an English architect
Sir Guy Garrod, senior UK Royal Air Force officer
Sir Guy Gaunt, Australian-born officer of the British Royal Navy
Sir Guy Granet, British railway administrator
Sir Guy Green (judge), Governor of Tasmania
Sir Guy Lloyd, 1st Baronet, Scottish Unionist Party politician
Sir Guy Anstruther Knox Marshall, British entomologist and authority on Curculionidae
Sir Guy Palmes, High Sheriff and Justice of the Peace for Yorkshire.
Sir Guy Powles, New Zealand diplomat and Governor of Western Samoa
Sir Guy Russell, British naval commander
Sir Guy Salisbury-Jones, Major-General in the Royal Household Diplomatic Corps
Sir Guy Standing (actor), an English actor
Sir Guy Williams (British Army officer) who served in World War II
Sir Guy Francis Laking, artist and first keeper of the London Museum
Sir Guy Douglas Arthur Fleetwood Wilson, a British public servant in colonial India
Sir Guy Of Warwick, stage name of Renaissance Festival performer

In fiction 
Sir Guy, a character in Timeline (novel) by Michael Crichton
Sir Guyon fictional character in Spenser's The Faerie Queene
Sir Guy Paynter, a character in Crusade (Laird novel)
Sir Guy de Guide, an aristocratic fox in Bertie the Bunyip TV puppet show

Other 

Sir Guy Carleton Elementary School in Vancouver, Canada
Sir Guy Carleton Secondary School in Ottawa, Canada